Bolulla is a Valencian town and municipality located in the comarca of Marina Baixa, in the province of Alicante, Spain. Bolulla has an area of 13.6 km² and, according to the Spanish National Statistics Institute, a total population of 421 inhabitants at 1 January 2014 (of which 241 Spaniards and 180 foreigners). The economy of Bolulla is exclusively based on agriculture. The most important monument in the town is the Catholic church of Sant Josep (Saint Joseph), built in the 18th century.

References

Municipalities in the Province of Alicante
Marina Baixa